Izaak Enschedé (16 April 1681, Haarlem – 1 May 1761, Haarlem) was the founder of the printing company Royal Joh. Enschedé in 1703.

He was the son of Johannes Enschda (baptised 18 July 1642, Groningen – 4 October 1706, Haarlem) and Elisabeth Jansdochter van den Berg (27 April 1632, Haarlem – 18 July 1723, Haarlem).

On 29 October 1702 in Haarlem he married Beeltje van der Lucht (22 January 1677, Haarlem – 8 March 1756, Haarlem), daughter of Barend Stevenzoon van der Lucht en Jozijntje Marchant.

Until then Enschedé worked for the Opregte Haarlemsche Courant that was owned by the heirs of Vincent Casteleyn. Together with his son Johannes, they  bought the newspaper in 1737, the same year they were named city publisher by the council of Haarlem. The family business went well and they took over the typesetting business of the Amsterdam publisher Hendrik Floris Wetstein in 1743, which had fonts designed by the punchcutter Joan Michaël Fleischman.

References and footnotes 

18th-century Dutch businesspeople
People from Haarlem
Joh. Enschedé
1681 births
1761 deaths